Waldo Bridge may refer to:

 Waldo Covered Bridge, a covered bridge in Alabama, United States
 Waldo-Hancock Bridge, a suspension bridge in Maine, United States